Anheqiaobei station is a station on Line 4 of the Beijing Subway. It is the northern terminus of Line 4 and located just outside the northwest corner of the 5th Ring Road. It is the only station on Line 4 built above-ground and has separated platforms.

Station Layout 
The station has one island platform and one side platform on street level.

Exits 
There are four exits, lettered A, B, C, and D. Exits A and B are accessible.

References

External links
 

Beijing Subway stations in Haidian District
Railway stations in China opened in 2009